Peter Sivess (September 23, 1913 – June 1, 2003) was a Major League Baseball pitcher. He pitched all or part of three seasons in the majors, from 1936 until 1938, for the Philadelphia Phillies.

After professional baseball, Sivess worked for a few years at Grumman Aircraft prior to joining the US Navy during World War II. Following the war, he worked for the CIA.

Sivess was raised in South River, New Jersey. He died on June 1, 2003, in Candler, North Carolina, aged 89.

References

External links

Major League Baseball pitchers
Philadelphia Phillies players
Baltimore Orioles (IL) players
Milwaukee Brewers (minor league) players
Newark Bears (IL) players
Jersey City Giants players
Indianapolis Indians players
Elmira Pioneers players
Dickinson Red Devils baseball players
Springfield Nationals players
Baseball players from Pennsylvania
People from South River, New Jersey
1913 births
2003 deaths